Ladies Only is a 1939 Indian Hindi-language social comedy film directed by Sarvottam Badami. Produced by Sagar Movietone, it had music by Anupam Ghatak and starred Surendranath, Sabita Devi, Bibbo and Prabha. This was the last comedy film made by Sarvottam Badami before he left Sagar Movietone. He joined his mentor Ambalal Patel, at Sudama Pictures to start making "socially relevant" films.

The story involved three girls from different region (States) meeting at a railway station, and their relationship with each other thereafter.

Plot
Three girls from different regions of India, Sabita Devi (Gujarat), Bibbo (Punjab), and Prabha (Bengal) meet at a railway station. With no place to stay they decide to find accommodation together. A cook (Bhudo Advani) joins them speaking the language from each state. A young crook (Surendra) enters their life and trouble starts brewing between the girls when they all fall in love with him.

Cast
Credits adapted from the films's pressbook:
 Sabita Devi as Sarojini
 Surendranath as Satish
 Bibbo as Asha
 Prabha as Chhaya
 Advani as Jayaram
 Harish as Harish
 Pande as Press Proprietor
 Krishnakumari as Mrs. Durgadas
 Gulzar as Indira
 Sunalini Devi as Headmistress
 Kaushalya as Indoo

Music
Music was composed by Anupam Ghatak with lyrics by Zia Sarhadi and Pandit Indra Chandra.

Song List

References

External links

1939 films
1930s Hindi-language films
Indian black-and-white films
Indian comedy films
1939 comedy films
Films directed by Sarvottam Badami
Hindi-language comedy films